The Mother's Monument, or Monument to the Mother (Spanish: Monumento a la Madre), is a monument commemorating Mexican mothers, installed in Mexico City, inaugurated on May 10, 1949. It was destroyed on September 19, 2017, after an earthquake of magnitude 7.1 on the Richter scale that shook Mexico City, and reopened on November 21, 2018.

Description and history
In Mexico, the idea of paying tribute to mothers with a monument arose in 1922, when then Secretary of Public Education, José Vasconcelos, and the journalist Rafael Alducín, founder of the newspaper Excélsior, wanted to pay "a tribute of love and tenderness", on May 10. In 1944, President Manuel Ávila Camacho laid the first stone of what would be the Monument to the Mother. The monument was inaugurated by Miguel Alemán Valdés on May 10, 1949.

The architectural component was completed by José Villagrán García, while the sculptures were designed by Luis Ortiz Monasterio, who won a contest held by Excélsior in 1948. The monument is located in the Garden of Art, between the streets of Sullivan, Villalongín, and Avenida de los Insurgentes, dividing the colonies Cuauhtémoc and San Rafael (in the Cuauhtémoc delegation). It features three sculptures: an indigenous man seen writing, an indigenous woman with an ear of corn (a symbol of fertility), and a mother with a child in her arms.

On September 19, 2017, the monument's central sculpture collapsed due to a 7.1-magnitude earthquake that shook Mexico City. On November 21, 2018, the government of Mexico City reopened the monument. The project was carried out by the architect Gabriel Mérigo.

References

External links

 

1949 establishments in Mexico
1949 sculptures
Monuments and memorials in Mexico City
Monuments and memorials to women
Outdoor sculptures in Mexico City
Sculptures of children
Sculptures of men in Mexico
Sculptures of women in Mexico
Statues in Mexico City
Women in Mexico City